Clavus unizonalis, common name the one-zoned turrid, is a species of sea snail, a marine gastropod mollusk in the family Drilliidae.

Description
The size of an adult shell varies between 15 mm and 26 mm. The shell is nodosely plicate, smooth, or with a few close revolving lines at the base. The color is whitish or yellowish white, the body whorl below the periphery chocolate, sometimes with a white band at the base. The color of the interior is chocolate, with an irregular white superior band.

Distribution
This species occurs in the Red Sea, off northern Mozambique and in the demersal zone of the tropical Indo-Pacific off Mozambique, Japan, the Philippines, Indonesia, Papua New Guinea, the Solomon Islands, New Caledonia and the Loyalty Islands; also off Australia (Northern Territory, Queensland and Western Australia).

It has also been found in Pliocene strata of Papua New Guinea (age range: 5.332 to 2.588 Ma)

References

 Lamarck, J.B.P.A. de M. 1822. Histoire naturelle des Animaux sans Vertèbres. Paris : J.B. Lamarck Vol. 7 711 pp. 
 Reeve, L.A. 1845. Monograph of the genus Pleurotoma. pls 20–33 in Reeve, L.A. (ed). Conchologia Iconica. London : L. Reeve & Co. Vol. 1. 
 M.M. Schepman, Full text of "Siboga expeditie" 
 Abrard (R.), 1947 Fossiles néogènes et quaternaires des Nouvelles-Hébrides (Missions E. Aubert de la Rüe, 1934–1936). Annales de Paléontologie, t. 32, p. 3–113
 Bouge, L.J. & Dautzenberg, P.L. 1914. Les Pleurotomides de la Nouvelle-Caledonie et de ses dependances. Journal de Conchyliologie 61: 123–214 
 Melvill, J.C. 1917. A revision of the Turridae (Pleurotomidae) occurring in the Persian Gulf, Gulf of Oman and North Arabian Sea as evidenced mostly through the results of dredgings carried out by Mr. F.W. Townsend, 1893–1914. Proceedings of the Malacological Society of London 12(4–5): 140–201
 Habe, T. & Kosuge, S. 1967. Shells of the world in colour, II. The tropical Pacific. Osaka : Hoikusha 194 pp. 
 Cernohorsky, W.O. 1978. Tropical Pacific Marine Shells. Sydney : Pacific Publications 352 pp., 68 pls.
 Wells, F.E. & Bryce, C.W. 1986. Seashells of Western Australia. Perth : Western Australian Museum 207 pp.
 Kilburn, R.N. 1988. Turridae (Mollusca: Gastropoda) of southern Africa and Mozambique. Part 4 Drilliinae, Crassispirinae and Strictispirinae. Annals of the Natal Museum 29(1): 167–320
 Wells F.E. (1991) A revision of the Recent Australian species of the turrid genera Clavus, Plagiostropha, and Tylotiella (Mollusca: Gastropoda). Journal of the Malacological Society of Australia 12: 1–33.
 Wilson, B. 1994. Australian Marine Shells. Prosobranch Gastropods. Kallaroo, WA : Odyssey Publishing Vol. 2 370 pp.
 Tucker, J.K. 2004 Catalog of recent and fossil turrids (Mollusca: Gastropoda). Zootaxa 682:1–1295
 Severns M. (2011) Shells of the Hawaiian Islands – The Sea Shells. Conchbooks, Hackenheim. 564 pp

External links
 
 

unizonalis
Gastropods described in 1822